Malcolm Pratt Snider (born April 5, 1947) is a former professional American football guard and tackle who played six seasons in the National Football League.

College career
After graduating from North Salem High School in Salem, Oregon, Snider attended Stanford University, where he was an All-American tackle in 1968.

NFL career
He was drafted in the third round of the 1969 NFL Draft by the Atlanta Falcons. He played three seasons with the Falcons before being traded to the Green Bay Packers in 1972 where he played three more NFL seasons before retiring.

While playing football in Wisconsin, Snider attended medical school at the University of Wisconsin part-time, eventually receiving his MD in 1978. He returned to his hometown of Salem where he is a retired orthopedic surgeon.

References

1947 births
Stanford Cardinal football players
Green Bay Packers players
Atlanta Falcons players
Sportspeople from Salem, Oregon
American orthopedic surgeons
Living people
North Salem High School (Salem, Oregon) alumni